The discography of Meredith Andrews, an American singer-songwriter and worship leader. Andrews is signed to Word Records.

Albums

Studio albums

Live albums

EPs

Singles

Album appearances 

2008

 "You're Not Alone" – included on Revolve: All Access

2010

 "You're Not Alone" – included on Get the Truth
 "New Song We Sing" – included on WOW Worship: Purple

Music videos 

 "You're Not Alone" (2008)

References 

Discographies of American artists
Christian music discographies